Neue Schütz-Ausgabe (new Schütz edition) is a new critical edition of the complete works by composer Heinrich Schütz (full title in German: Heinrich Schütz: Neue Ausgabe sämtlicher Werke).  It is published by Bärenreiter-Verlag on a commission by the international Heinrich-Schütz-Gesellschaft.

Content 

When completed, the edition will comprise the following volumes:

 Historien und Passionen (3 vol)
 Musikalische Exequien 
 Geistliche Chormusik (2 vol)
 Becker Psalter (2 vol)
 Zwölf Geistliche Gesänge 1657 
 Cantiones sacrae (2 vol)
 Kleine geistliche Konzerte (3 vol)
 Symphoniae sacrae [[I–III (9 vol)
 Italienische Madrigale 
 Psalmen Davids (4 vol)
 Single psalms (2 vol)
 Hochzeitskonzerte, dialogues, funeral music (3 vol)
 Choralkonzerte und Choralsätze 
 Single works
 Größere Kirchenkonzerte (2 vol)
 Secular songs and madrigals (2 vol)
 Schwanengesang
 Supplement (5 vol)

External links 
 Heinrich Schütz (1585–1672) New Edition of the Complete Works Bärenreiter
 Internationale Heinrich-Schütz-Gesellschaft

Baroque compositions
Schutz
Textual scholarship